The Governor Coles State Memorial, also known as the Edward E. Coles Monument and the Governor Coles Monument, is a concrete memorial dedicated to Edward Coles, the second governor of Illinois (1822 to 1826).  Erected between 1928-1929, the memorial features a bronze portrait of Coles sculpted by Leon Hermant, and is maintained by the Illinois Historic Preservation Agency as a state historic site.  The memorial is located in Valley View Cemetery in Edwardsville, Illinois.

References

External links
Governor Bond State Memorial

Illinois State Historic Sites
Monuments and memorials in Illinois
Buildings and structures in Madison County, Illinois
Concrete sculptures in Illinois
1929 sculptures
Bronze sculptures in Illinois
Governor of Illinois